Auslogics BoostSpeed is a software application presented as a bundle of software utilities intended to speed up, optimise and clean the user's computer, fix registry errors, improve Internet performance, remove unneeded files and entries, and defragment the disks and the registry. The program can also adjust Windows settings to match a specific computer configuration with the intent to improve Internet speed and reduce computer startup and shutdown time. The program is intended for use on computers that run the Microsoft Windows operating system.

Publisher
The program is published by Auslogics, an Australian-based company that specializes in maintenance software for computers that run the Microsoft Windows operating system. Started in 2008, the company products include Auslogics BoostSpeed and Auslogics Disk Defrag. In 2009 the company partnered with Sony Vaio to develop part of the Sony Vaio Care software installed on the Vaio laptops and desktop PC's. As of 2011, Auslogics has the Premier Elite Partner status in the Intel Software Partner Program.

History
Auslogics BoostSpeed 3 was the first official release of the program, as prior versions were deemed by their developers as requiring more work to be done. It started out with limited computer optimization options and expanded to include 18 utilities combined into one computer maintenance suite in version 5.2.0.0. The publisher also made the program available in different languages, with more languages being added from version to version.

ZOTAC, a Macau-based hardware manufacturer, included Auslogics BoostSpeed in its ZOTAC Boost XL software bundle, which is supplied with ZOTAC's mini-computers.

Independent tests

Auslogics BoostSpeed software received the Editor's Pick award from several software distributing and reviewing websites, including 
DownloadPipe, Brothersoft, Software.Informer, Free Downloads Center. It has been reviewed by computer experts from a number of industry magazines and websites, such as the online CNet, PC World, SoftwareCrew, as well as printed editions – Windows Vista: the Official Magazine, Computer Buyer, PC Advisor, Computer Shopper, Micro Mart. Most give it their highest mark pointing out the program's advantages, including the large number of computer system optimization tools included in one suite, its small size, its high speed and ease of use for inexperienced customers.

Among the disadvantages mentioned in online reviews are the limited functionality of the application's trial version and, again, the large number of tools, which requires a user to spend some time to get up to date with the application.

The Ultimate Guide to Windows Vista book published in 2008 recommends using Auslogics BoostSpeed to optimize Windows-based systems saying that "Tests showed an impressive performance improvement on a 4-year-old laptop and its optimization techniques should work for a much newer computer, too."

In the independent tests performed by Asiasoft Online, an Asian publisher of Massively Multiplayer Online Games, Auslogics BoostSpeed improved the gaming experience on test systems by speeding up game launching, eliminating lags and increasing frame rate.

Antivirus Detections 
Auslogics BoostSpeed now gets flagged by major antivirus software not because of the features of the program, but because of the model not giving user choice to try the program.

Present Day Alternatives 
There are a few present day alternatives which offer user choice and more features than Auslogics BoostSpeed, including:

 SafeSoft PC Cleaner 
 ccleaner
 Restoro

References

Computer system optimization software